Al-Ittihad (Arabic: الاتحاد "The Union"), sometimes transliterated as Al-Etihad or Al-Ettihad may refer to:

Sports

Football

Libya
Al-Ittihad Club (Tripoli), a football club based in Bab Ben Gashier
Al Ittihad Gheryan, a football club based in Gharyan
Alittihad Misurata SC, a football club based in Misurata

Other countries
(by country)
Al Ettihad Club (Bahrain), a football club in Bahrain
Al Ittihad Alexandria Club, or Al-Ittihad Al-Sakandary, or Union Alexandria, a multisport club in Egypt
Al-Ittihad SC, a multisport club in Iraq
Hapoel al-Ittihad Nazareth, an Arab-Israeli football club based in Nazareth, Israel
Al-Ittihad Club (Salalah), a football club in Oman
Al-Ittihad Club (Nablus), a football club in Palestine
Al-Gharafa, renamed from Al-Ittihad in 2004, a football club based in Al Rayyan, Qatar
Al-Ittihad Club (Jeddah), a multisport club in Saudi Arabia
Al-Ittihad SC (Sudan), a football club in Sudan
Al-Ittihad SC Aleppo, a football club in Syria
Al-Ittihad Kalba SC, a football club based in Kalba, United Arab Emirates
Al-Ittihad SCC (Ibb), a football club in Yemen

Basketball
Al-Ittihad Alexandria, better known as Al-Ittihad Al-Sakandary, the basketball team of Al Ittihad Alexandria Club, Egypt
Al-Ittihad Jeddah (basketball), the basketball team of Al-Ittihad Club, Saudi Arabia
Al-Ittihad, Tripoli, Libya

Newspapers
Al Ittihad Al Ichtiraki, a daily Arabic-language newspaper in Morocco, founded in 1983
Al-Ittihad (Emirati newspaper), a daily Arabic-language newspaper founded in 1969
Al-Ittihad (Israeli newspaper), a daily Arabic-language newspaper based in Haifa and founded in 1944
Al-Ittihad (Lebanese newspaper), an Arabic-language newspaper that was published in 2017

Other uses
Al-Ittihad, Ramallah, a town in the Palestinian territories
Al-Itihaad al-Islamiya, an Islamist militant group in Somalia that was active from 1992 to 2006
Etihad Airways, flag carrier airline of Abu Dhabi, United Arab Emirates

See also
Etihad (disambiguation)